Fritz Hedges Waterway Park, also known as Portage Bay Park, is a  park on the north shore of Portage Bay in the neighborhood of University District of Seattle, Washington. 

The park includes a beach, pier, and a canoe and kayak launch. The park is Seattle's newest park, having been opened on October 14th, 2020. Construction of the park took two years and included improvements to the habitat for salmon at the shoreline. The University of Washington owned the site since the 1970s and transferred ownership to the City of Seattle in 2013. The Washington State Department of Transportation provided $14 million to the city to purchase the site as compensation for the loss of public waterfront property due to the widening of State Route 520. The city provided $9 million to develop the park and the university paid $2.4 million for environmental remediation. The University Police station and a campus recycling facility were demolished to allow public access to the waterfront. The park was named after a Frederick 'Fritz' Hedges, a Seattle Parks and Recreation employee who died in 2004. The parks department said that Hedges "dedicated his life to the idea that parks and recreation are vital".

References

External links
 
 Seattle Parks and Recreation announcement
 Frederick 'Fritz' Hedges obituary in The Seattle Times 

Parks in Seattle
2020 establishments in Washington (state)
University District, Seattle